Mattituck  is a station on the Main Line (Greenport Branch) of the Long Island Rail Road. It is located on Love Lane and Pike Street, north of New York State Route 25 in Mattituck, New York.

History 

The station was originally named Mattetuck and opened on July 29, 1844. It was rebuilt in 1878 and remodeled in 1944. The station house was closed in 1959 and razed in July 1967, but the station still remained active. When Cutchogue station was closed in June 1962, Mattituck station became one of two replacements, the other being the former Peconic station, which itself closed sometime in 1970. The station contained a total of three "produce storage" facilities, which still exists today, one of which is a real estate office. A new station with high-level platforms was built between 2000 and 2001, which many stations on the LIRR were getting at the time.

Station layout
This station has one high-level side platform south of the tracks that is long enough for one and a half cars to receive and discharge passengers. The Main Line has three tracks at this location: one is a siding and one is a freight spur.

References

External links 

Unofficial LIRR History Website
1930 and 1966 Photos
Unofficial LIRR Photography Site (lirrpics.com)
Mattituck Station
 Station from Google Maps Street View

Long Island Rail Road stations in Suffolk County, New York
Southold, New York
Railway stations in the United States opened in 1844
1844 establishments in New York (state)